Gomba is an unclassified language of Ethiopia. It may be Afro-Asiatic.

References
 "Towards a new classification of African languages", Linguistic Contribution to the History of Sub-Saharan Africa, University of Lyons

Languages of Ethiopia
Unclassified languages of Africa